Nanyang is a prefecture-level city in the southwest of Henan province, China. The city with the largest administrative area in Henan, Nanyang borders Xinyang to the southeast, Zhumadian to the east, Pingdingshan to the northeast, Luoyang to the north, Sanmenxia to the northwest, the province of Shaanxi to the west, and the province of Hubei to the south.

Dinosaur egg fossils have been discovered in the Nanyang Basin.

The 35,000 capacity Nanyang Sports Centre Stadium is the main (football) venue in the city.

Names 
In the name "Nanyang", Nan means south, and Yang (/) means sun—the south side of a mountain, or the north side of a river, in Chinese is called Yang. The name came from Nanyang Commandery, a commandery established in the region during the Warring States period. Before the name "Nanyang" became associated with the city itself, it was referred to as "Wan".

History

Nanyang was the capital of the state of Shen in the first millennium BCE. It became commercially important under the Han dynasty, as it had many iron foundries and other manufacturing sites, and also fell at the convergence of routes between major cities. In the Dong Han period, it was known for business and luxury, and was for a time the southern capital. It subsequently declined somewhat in importance, but remained a political and cultural center of southwestern Henan province and a hub for trade.

Geography
Nanyang is located in southwestern Henan, bordering Hubei (Xiangyang, Shiyan, and Suizhou) to the south, Shaanxi (Shangluo) to the west and the following prefecture-level cities in Henan:

 Zhumadian (E)
 Xinyang (SE)
 Sanmenxia (NW)
 Luoyang (N)
 Pingdingshan (NE)

The latitude of the entire prefecture ranges from 32° 17' to 33° 48' N, while the longitude ranges from 110° 58' to 113° 49' E, and the prefecture spans . The city lies within the Nanyang Basin, which is part of a region in Central China that lies in the gap between the eastern end of the Qin Mountains and the source of the Huai River. Thus, using those two geographic features as the standard dividing line, it is difficult to classify the city into northern or southern China.

To the north of Nanyang city proper, there is a mountain called Mount Du, which is famous for the Dushan jade, one of the four famous jades of China, now a rarity. To the southwest is Neixiang County with the newly developing Baotianman Biosphere Reserve—an area of high biodiversity, with 65 rare and endangered species.

Climate 
The climate is generally moderate and is a four-season humid subtropical climate (Köppen Cwa), with strong monsoon influences: winters are cool but dry, and summers are hot and humid. Spring and autumn provide transitions of reasonable length. More than half the annual rainfall occurs from June to August.

Environment

Demographics 
The whole city area has a population over 10.26 million, which is the twelfth prefecture-level city in China now. The built-up area has over 1.8 million people, which is the fifth largest city in Henan Province.
About 1 million commute from the city, mainly to Zhengzhou, Guangdong province, Beijing and Shanghai.
The majority of the province is Han; among the minority nationalities are the Hui people and Man people.

Population
As of the 2020 Chinese census, Nanyang was home to 9,713,112 people, ranking nineteenth in China, and its built-up (or metro) area made of Wolong and Wancheng Districts was home to 2,085,680 people.

Ethnic groups

Language

Health

Education
Nanyang higher education already has a good foundation for development. Nanyang is a great city of education. It has a fine tradition of respecting teachers and teaching and educating students. It has taken the lead in proposing a strategy of science and education in the country. In particular, in recent years, the municipal party committee and the municipal government have attached great importance to education. The education industry in our city has developed vigorously and the face of higher education has undergone tremendous changes. There are 6 colleges and universities in the city, with nearly 90,000 students. All colleges and universities adhere to the Party's education policy, implement the fundamental tasks of Lide Shuren, and have achieved unprecedented achievements in personnel training, scientific research, social services, cultural heritage innovation and international exchanges and cooperation, which not only promotes the city's science and technology. Innovation, social progress and improvement of people's livelihood have also laid a good foundation for achieving a higher level of development at a new starting point.

Schools and Libraries

Primary education

Secondary education

 No.1 High school of Nanyang
 No.2 High School of Nanyang
 No.5 High School of Nanyang
 No.8 High School of Nanyang

Library 
 Nanyang Library

Higher education
 Nanyang Institute of Technology()
 Nanyang Normal University()
 Nanyang Medical College()
 Henan Polytechnic Institute()
 Nanyang Vocational College of Agriculture()

Urbanization

Religion

Administration
The prefecture-level city of Nanyang administers 2 districts, 1 county-level city and 10 counties.

Wolong District
Wancheng District
Dengzhou City
Xinye County
Sheqi County
Tanghe County
Tongbai County
Fangcheng County
Nanzhao County
Zhenping County
Neixiang County
Xixia County
Xichuan County

Economy
Nanyang has a developing cattle industry, as well as a tobacco factory.
The Bai River flows through Nanyang and provides it with an abundant supply of fish.
Nanyang produces two kinds of quality wine: Shedianlaojiu and Wolongyuye.
Nanyang oil field is the second largest oil field in Henan Province.
Agriculture plays an important role in its economy.
There is a large optical component production community in the area comprising several factories.

Infrastructure

Transport

Railways
Nanyang has two major railway stations: Nanyang Railway Station and Nanyang East Railway Station. There are also several other small stations serving suburban areas.

Nanyang is a railway junction for the Nanjing-Xi'an Railway and the Jiaozuo-Liuzhou Railway. Direct train service is available to Shanghai, Nanjing, and Hefei to the east, Xian and Lanzhou to the west, Luoyang to the north and Liuzhou to the south.
Nanyang East Railway Station is a railway station on Zhengzhou–Wanzhou high-speed railway. Direct train service is available to Beijing, Shanghai, and Zhengzhou.

Highways and expressways 
Over  of highway network has been built along the railway line and others. An  beltway is being constructed surrounding the city. Installation will begin early 2010.

China National Highway
China National Highway 207
China National Highway 234
China National Highway 311
China National Highway 312

China National Expressway
G40 Shanghai–Xi'an Expressway
G55 Erenhot–Guangzhou Expressway
G0421 Xuchang–Guangzhou Expressway

Henan Provincial Expressways
S81 Shangqiu–Nanyang Expressway
S83 Lankao–Nanyang Expressway
S98 Neixiang–Dengzhou Expressway

Airport and airlines 
Nanyang Jiangying Airport is one of three civil aviation airports in the province. It is only 20 minutes bus time from the urban area. Passengers can take flights to and from Beijing, Shanghai, Guangzhou, Shenzhen, and Guilin.

There are also two avion airports.

Public transit 
Nanyang city buses have about 30 lines in the urban area. Taxis are common.

Culture 

The official language of Nanyang is Mandarin Chinese, but most locals speak the Henan dialect, with its easily identifiable stereotypical features; this local dialect is known as Nanyang Hua, and is spoken by about 15 million people in the area.

There is also a local form of Chinese opera called Wan Opera.

Famous people from Nanyang

 Zhang Heng, Eastern Han Dynasty astronomer, mathematician and inventor of the first seismometer in history.
 Zhang Zhongjing, late Eastern Han Dynasty physician and pharmacist.
 Zhuge Liang, renowned adviser to Liu Bei and the first chancellor of the Shu Han during the Three Kingdoms era.
 Gan Ning, general of Wu during the Three Kingdoms, born in Nanyang.
 Han Yu, Tang Dynasty poet.
 Huang Zhong,  a leading military general of the Shu Han ruled by Liu Bei during the Three Kingdoms era, was one of the Five Tiger Generals of Shu.
 Chang Wanquan, former Minister of National Defense of China, former Director of the General Armaments Department and commander of the Shenyang Military Region, born in January 1949 in Nanyang
 Eryue He, writer
 Feng Youlan, philosopher
 Qin Yinglin, pig breeder
 Vivi Miao, actress
 Yao Xueyin, writer
 Wang Yongmin, computer scientist
 Shi Zhengli, virologist

Within the metropolitan area

Temples, cathedrals, and mosques
Wolong Gang
Nanyang Mansion (Ming & Qing Dynasty)
Temple of holy doctor Zhang Zhongjing
Zhang Heng's Grave (Han Dynasty)
Art Museum of Stone Portrait and Carvings of Han Dynasty

Outside the metropolitan area, but within the municipality

Temples, cathedrals, and mosques
Jingziguan in Xichuan County is a historical and cultural town.
Neixiang County Mansion (Ming & Qing Dynasty)
Sheqi Meeting Place (Qing Dynasty)
Dengzhou Huazhou College

Sights
Funiu Shan World Geology Park
Danjiangkou Reservoir
Tongbai Water-Curtain Cave Temple
Shiren Mountain
Wu Hou Ci

See also 
Expressways of Henan
China National Highways
Expressways of China
Henan
Wolong District
Wancheng District

References 

Ayscough, Florence. 1939. “An Uncommon Aspect of Han Sculpture: Figures from Nan-yang”. Monumenta Serica 4 (1). Maney Publishing: 334–44. An Uncommon Aspect of Han Sculpture: Figures from Nan-yang.

External links

Government website of Nanyang (in Chinese)
Government website of Nanyang (in English)

 
Prefecture-level divisions of Henan